There are a number of national college baseball awards given each year. Here are the most prominent:

Team championships
College World Series championship (NCAA Division I)
NCAA Division II championship
NCAA Division III championship
NAIA Baseball World Series championship
NCBA World Series division D1 championship
NCBA World Series division D2 championship
American Baseball Coaches Association (ABCA) National Champions in: NCAA Divisions I, II, and III, NAIA, and NJCAA Divisions I, II, and III
American Baseball Coaches Association (ABCA) Conference Champions in: NCAA Division I, II, and III conferences, NAIA conferences, NJCAA Division I, II, and III conferences, NCCAA conferences, and community-college conferences

Player awards
Golden Spikes Award – Though not specific to college baseball, this award is presented by USA Baseball to the amateur baseball player of the year. It has always been given to a college baseball player; two winners were junior college players, and all of the rest have been NCAA Division I players.
Dick Howser Trophy – player of the year, as determined by the National Collegiate Baseball Writers Association.
Baseball America College Player of the Year
Collegiate Baseball Player of the Year (NCAA Division I)
American Baseball Coaches Association (ABCA) Player of the Year in: NCAA Divisions I, II, and III, NAIA, and NJCAA Divisions I, II, and III
National Pitcher of the Year Award - Pitcher of the year, as determined by the College Baseball Foundation
Buster Posey Award – catcher of the year, as determined by selected sportscasters, sportswriters, Division I head coaches and professional scouts.
Brooks Wallace Award – shortstop of the year, as determined by the College Baseball Foundation
Bobby Bragan Collegiate Slugger Award- awarded to the best hitter in the nation, as determined by the Selection Committee for Bobby Bragan Collegiate Slugger Award
John Olerud Award – given to the best two-way player of the year, as determined by the College Baseball Foundation
Stopper of the Year Award – given to the best relief pitcher in college baseball
American Baseball Coaches Association (ABCA) Gold Glove in: NCAA Divisions I, II, and III, NAIA, and NJCAA Divisions I, II, and III
D3baseball.com Player of the Year (Division III)
D3baseball.com Pitcher of the Year (Division III)
Senior CLASS Award (baseball) (outstanding senior NCAA Division I Student-Athlete of the Year in baseball)
Baseball Academic All-America of the Year by College Sports Information Directors of America
College World Series Most Outstanding Player
College Baseball All-America Teams:
Baseball America All-America Teams
Collegiate Baseball All-Americans (NCAA Division I)
ABCA/Rawlings All-Americans (first, second, and third teams) in: NCAA Divisions I, II, and III, NAIA, and NJCAA Divisions I, II, and III
D3baseball.com All-Americans (Division III)
ABCA/Rawlings All-Region teams in: NCAA Divisions I, II, and III, NAIA, and NJCAA Divisions I, II, and III
Baseball America Freshman Of The Year
Collegiate Baseball Freshman Pitcher of the Year
Collegiate Baseball Freshman Player of the Year
Baseball America Freshman All-America Team
Louisville Slugger's Freshmen All-American Baseball Team (Collegiate Baseball)
Baseball America Summer College Player of the Year

Coaching awards
American Baseball Coaches Association (ABCA) National and Regional Coaches of the Year in: NCAA Divisions I, II, and III, NAIA, and NJCAA Divisions I, II, and III
Baseball America College Coach of the Year
Collegiate Baseball Coach of the Year (NCAA Division I)
National Collegiate Baseball Writers Association (NCBWA) National Coach of the Year
Chuck Tanner Collegiate Baseball Manager of the Year Award
ABCA/Baseball America Assistant Coach of the Year
 Skip Bertman Award (head coaches) (College Baseball Foundation)

Discontinued awards
Rotary Smith Award (1988-2003) – Founded by the Greater Houston Sports Association in 1988 to honor the most outstanding player of the year. In 1996, the Rotary Club of Houston joined the award committee. In 2004, it was succeeded by the Roger Clemens Award (honoring the most outstanding college baseball pitcher).
Roger Clemens Award (2004-2008) – pitcher of the year, as determined by Division I head coaches, a selection of national sports media, previous finalists for the Clemens Award and the 16 last winners of the Rotary Smith Award.

See also

List of college baseball career home run leaders

List of collegiate summer baseball leagues

Footnotes

External links
2009 College Baseball Foundation Awards Show MLB Advanced Media, L.P. Retrieved 2009-08-31.
College Baseball Foundation official website. Retrieved 2009-08-31.
American Baseball Coaches Association (ABCA) official website. Retrieved 2009-08-31.
National Collegiate Baseball Writers Association (NCBWA) official website. Retrieved 2009-08-31.

 
Awards
college baseball awards